The Virginia Governor's Mansion, better known as the Executive Mansion, is located in Richmond, Virginia, on Capitol Square and serves as the official residence of the governor of the Commonwealth of Virginia. Designed by Alexander Parris, it is the oldest occupied governor's mansion in the United States.  It has served as the home of Virginia governors and their families since 1813. This mansion is both a Virginia and a National Historic Landmark, and has had a number of successive renovations and expansions during the 20th century.

Adjacent and immediately north of Capitol Square is the Court End neighborhood, which houses the White House of the Confederacy. During the Civil War, the Virginia State Capitol, also in Richmond, housed offices of the Confederacy. Tours of the mansion are offered several days a week.

History

When Richmond became the capital of Virginia in 1779, there was no residence for the governor, but Thomas Jefferson rented one. The state was so poor that it could not pay the rent in time and blamed Jefferson for the problem. The state finally paid its rent and built a residence for the governor on the site of the present building.

The law that provided for the construction of the current building was signed on February 13, 1811, by James Monroe, with the building being completed in 1813. Monroe was succeeded by George William Smith in 1811, but Smith was not the first governor to live in the mansion because he lost his life in the Richmond Theatre fire while he was saving others on December 26, 1811. His successor, James Barbour, was the first governor to live in the mansion. The term "mansion" was not used in the law authorizing it to be built, but it has been used ever since.

The gardens were redesigned in the 1950s, at the request of Governor Thomas B. Stanley, by noted landscape architect Charles Gillette. Under Governor James S. Gilmore III, the Mansion was renovated and expanded in an effort to restore the home to its historical appearance but also to bring the Mansion into compliance with the Americans with Disabilities Act and to provide additional living space for the First Family.

Anne Holton lived in the mansion twice: during the 1970s when her father, A. Linwood Holton Jr., was governor and when her husband Tim Kaine was governor. Thomas Jefferson's daughter Martha Jefferson Randolph, known as "Patsy", was also the daughter and wife (to Thomas Mann Randolph Jr.) of Virginia governors, but never lived in the Mansion.

Currently, Governor Glenn Youngkin occupies the mansion.

In the media 
It was featured on American Idol (season 5) when Tim Kaine and his wife, Anne Holton, welcomed Richmond-native and Idol-finalist Elliott Yamin and his family to the mansion on national television.

Restoration and remodeling work on the Mansion was shown on Bob Vila's Home Again television show's tenth season, which aired in early 2000.

The Mansion's most notable television appearance occurred on January 31, 2006, when recently inaugurated Governor Tim Kaine delivered the Democratic response to the 2006 State of the Union address. The address was delivered from the Mansion's historic ballroom.

Distinguished visitors
 Albert Edward, Prince of Wales (later King Edward VII)
 Queen Elizabeth II
 Rutherford B. Hayes
 Grover Cleveland
 William McKinley
 Theodore Roosevelt
 William Howard Taft
 Arthur Balfour
 Ferdinand Foch
 Winston Churchill
 Charles Lindbergh
 Richard Evelyn Byrd

See also
List of National Historic Landmarks in Virginia
National Register of Historic Places listings in Richmond, Virginia

References

External links

 Official site for the Executive Mansion
 Governor's Mansion: Virginia Is For Lovers
 Bob Vila Restoration Story
 Homes Of Virginia - The Governor's Mansion
  Richmond, Virginia, a National Park Service Discover Our Shared Heritage Travel Itinerary
 Governor's Mansion, Capitol Square, Richmond, Independent City, VA: 1 photo, 1 color transparency, 16 measured drawings, and 1 photo caption page at Historic American Buildings Survey
 Governor's Mansion, Summer Kitchen, Capitol Square, Richmond, Independent City, VA: 1 measured drawing at Historic American Buildings Survey

Historic American Buildings Survey in Virginia
Houses on the National Register of Historic Places in Virginia
Virginia
National Historic Landmarks in Virginia
Historic house museums in Virginia
Houses completed in 1813
Houses in Richmond, Virginia
Museums in Richmond, Virginia
Federal architecture in Virginia
Government buildings in Virginia
National Register of Historic Places in Richmond, Virginia
Governor of Virginia